Together is a British drama film written and directed by Paul Duddridge. It starred Peter Bowles, Sylvia Syms and Amanda Barrie. It was released on 12 January 2018.

Cast
 Peter Bowles as Philip
 Sylvia Syms as Rosemary
 Nina Wadia as Mrs Justice Reid
 Cathy Tyson as Linda Burns
 Juliet Cowan as Sheila Porter
 Amanda Barrie as Margaret
 Rufus Wright as Dr Ellis
 Carla Mendonça as Rachel
 Dominic Carter as DI Saunders
 Mihai Arsene as Nicolae
 Katie Sheridan as Carol
 Natey Jones as Stuart Marshall
 David Hargreaves as Sidney

Release
The film was released on 12 January 2018.

Reception
Critics generally praised the film and the actors' performances calling it a "touching film", but some felt it was under-directed. The Times labelled it having a "riveting and all too credible central idea", but went on to criticise the film, calling it "uneven".

References

External links
 

2018 drama films
British drama films